William Joscelyn Arkell FGS, FRS (9 June 1904 – 18 April 1958) was a British geologist and palaeontologist, regarded as the leading authority on the Jurassic Period during the middle part of the 20th century.

Childhood
Arkell was born in Highworth, Wiltshire, the youngest of a family of seven. His father, James Arkell was a partner in the prosperous family business Arkell's Brewery (which is still family owned today). His mother, Laura Jane Arkell was an artist of noted ability.

He developed a deep love of the English countryside from an early age, perhaps gained from long family summer holidays spent at Swanage, Dorset. He was later educated at Wellington College in Berkshire, where his ability in Natural History was recognised and he was able to devote significant time to develop his knowledge of this subject. He was a regular prize winner for his natural history essays, one of which was a treatise on the Dorset Robber Flies (Asilidae). He privately published a set of poems, Seven Poems, that reflected his love of nature and the outdoors.

Student life

In October 1922, at the second attempt (after failing the Latin examination), Arkell was admitted to New College, Oxford. He had initially intended to read entomology but despite being tutored by the great Julian Huxley, he decided that his career lay in geology and palaeontology. In 1925 he graduated with First Class Honours in geology. He remained at the University of Oxford after being awarded a Burdett-Coutts research scholarship. His research topic involved the taxonomy of the bivalves from the Upper Jurassic Corallian beds of England. For this and other papers on the Jurassic of southern England he was awarded a D Phil in 1928.

Whilst undertaking his doctoral research, Arkell spent four winter seasons (1926–30) investigating evidence of Palaeolithic human remains in the Nile Valley of Egypt in association with the University of Chicago. Four notable monographs were the result of this work.

Geological research

Arkell was awarded a lectureship in geology at New College, Oxford in 1927, and was made a senior research fellow of that College in 1929. With little teaching or administrative duties to speak of, Arkell was able to devote almost all his time to research. This culminated with the publication in 1933 of The Jurassic System of Great Britain. This 681-page work critically examined and consolidated all previous work on the Jurassic, including the formations described by the pioneer on British geology, William Smith, in the 19th century. It established Arkell as an authority on the Jurassic, which was remarkable given he was only 29.

He also published extensive work on the Upper Jurassic reef deposits (the Coral Rag) of England. He was an expert on the use of Jurassic limestones as building materials, publishing a book on the many different types of limestone used in the buildings of Oxford. The often obscure terminology used by miners and quarrymen was clarified by his dictionary of rock terms. Arkell was interested in the tectonic history of Southern England, particularly with reference to the highly folded beds of the Isle of Purbeck. He contributed to reports published by the British Geological Survey, especially around the area of Weymouth and Portland.

The Second World War interrupted his research in 1941 and Arkell worked for the Ministry of Transport in London when bombing of that city was at its most intense. In this period he became seriously ill, spending five months in hospital after a pneumothorax operation.

University of Cambridge
After demobilisation at the end of the war, Arkell accepted a senior research fellowship at Trinity College, Cambridge, holding an office at the Sedgwick Museum. In this time Arkell began to work on the use of ammonites as zone fossils in Jurassic stratigraphy and became the leading expert on this specialist area. He was inundated with fossils for identification, particularly from oil companies. As a consequence, he travelled widely in the Middle East examining many Jurassic exposures from this area.

Arkell then consolidated his knowledge of the Jurassic and published Jurassic Geology of the World in 1956. The large, detailed volume to this day remains a classic and influential text.

Personal life

Arkell married Ruby Percival in 1929 and bought a large house at Cumnor, near Oxford, before moving to Cambridge in 1949. They had three sons, born between 1932 and 1937. They also established a holiday home at Ringstead Bay in Dorset. Through his link with the family brewery business, Arkell was independently wealthy.

In the autumn of 1956 he suffered a severe stroke which left him partially paralysed and with double vision. This was a detriment to his Sunday hobby of watercolour painting. Despite this his determination to continue his work and correspondence at the University of Cambridge continued. He suffered a second stroke on 18 April 1958 and died several hours later.

Awards and honours
Arkell received a D Sc from the University of Oxford in 1934. In 1944 he received the Mary Clark Thompson Medal from the United States National Academy of Sciences. He was elected a Fellow of the Royal Society (FRS) in 1947. Arkell was awarded the Lyell Medal by the Geological Society of London in 1949, and the Leopold von Buch medal of the German Geological Society in 1953.

Works

References

External links

1904 births
1958 deaths
People from Highworth
People educated at Wellington College, Berkshire
Alumni of New College, Oxford
Fellows of New College, Oxford
Fellows of Trinity College, Cambridge
English palaeontologists
Fellows of the Geological Society of London
20th-century British geologists
Fellows of the Royal Society
Lyell Medal winners